Abubakar Ibrahim Al-Mas (Arabic: أبوبكر الماس) (born 26 February 1958) is a retired Yemeni football striker who played for Al-Tilal. He was the best player in the era of Yemen golden ball during the 1970s and until the beginning of the 1990s.

International goals

External links
 

1958 births
Living people
Yemeni footballers
Yemen international footballers
Al-Tilal SC players
Association football forwards
1976 AFC Asian Cup players
Footballers at the 1990 Asian Games
Yemeni League players
Asian Games competitors for Yemen
people from Aden